Jason Ryan Banks (born May 8, 1985 in Baton Rouge, Louisiana) is a former American football defensive end who played for the Arizona Cardinals of the National Football League. He was signed by the Cardinals as an undrafted free agent in 2008. He played college football at Grambling, and played his high school ball at McKinley Senior High School.

External links
Arizona Cardinals bio

1985 births
Living people
McKinley Senior High School alumni
Players of American football from Baton Rouge, Louisiana
American football defensive tackles
American football defensive ends
Grambling State Tigers football players
Arizona Cardinals players